Fort Énet (also spelled fort Énet in French) is a fortification in the Pertuis d'Antioche, in Charente-Maritime, Nouvelle-Aquitaine, France. It is located on the "Pointe de la Fumée", the roadway extending from the city of Fouras, between Fouras and Île-d'Aix, and can be accessed from there at low tide.

Fort Énet formed a line of fortification with Fort Boyard and Fort de la Rade on Île-d'Aix, designed to protect the arsenal of Rochefort from Royal Navy incursions. The building of the fort was started in 1810 by Napoleon I, following the devastating 1809 Battle of the Basque Roads.

The Fort can be reached on foot at low tide, and can be visited.

Fort Enet is listed as a Monument Historique. It is indexed in the Base Mérimée, a database of the French architectural patrimony maintained by the French Ministry of Culture, under the reference PA00132807.

Notes

Enet
Buildings and structures in Charente-Maritime
Infrastructure completed in 1810
Tourist attractions in Charente-Maritime
Islands of Charente-Maritime